Evin Rubar (born 14 December 1975) is a Swedish TV journalist and documentarian. Her family is of Kurdish origin.

Filmography 
 I skolans våld (In the School's Clutches), 2003
 Könskriget (The Gender War), 2005
 Det svenska sveket, 2007
 Syndabockarna, 2008
 Slaget om muslimerna, 2009
 Vårdlotteriet, 2011

Awards 
 Stiftelsen Staten och Rättens journalism award in 2003 for I skolans våld (In the School's Clutches)
 Guldspaden (The Golden Spade) in 2005 for Könskriget (The Gender War)
 Kristallen (The Crystal) in 2005

External links 
 A news article examining a controversy following one of Rubar's interviews

Notes

1975 births
Living people
Swedish journalists
Swedish people of Kurdish descent